Beirut is the capital and largest city  of  Lebanon. , Greater Beirut has a population of 2.5 million, which makes it the third-largest city in the Levant region. The city is situated on a peninsula at the midpoint of Lebanon's Mediterranean coast. Beirut has been inhabited for more than 5,000 years, and was one of Phoenicia's most prominent city states, making it one of the oldest cities in the world (see Berytus). The first historical mention of Beirut is found in the Amarna letters from the New Kingdom of Egypt, which date to the 14th century BC.

Beirut is Lebanon's seat of government and plays a central role in the Lebanese economy, with many banks and corporations based in the city. Beirut is an important seaport for the country and region, and rated a Beta + World City by the Globalization and World Cities Research Network. Beirut was severely damaged by the Lebanese Civil War, the 2006 Lebanon War, and the 2020 massive explosion in the Port of Beirut. Its cultural landscape underwent major reconstruction.

Names
The English name Beirut is an early transcription of the Arabic name . The Arabic name derives from Phoenician bēʾrūt. This was a modification of the Canaanite and Phoenician word  later bēʾrūt, meaning "wells", in reference to the site's accessible water table. Biruta was also mentioned in the Amarna letters from King Rib-Hadda of Byblos.

At the time of the crusades, the city was known in French as Barut or Baruth.

Prehistory
Beirut was settled over 5,000 years ago, and there is evidence that the surrounding area had already been inhabited for tens of thousands of years prior to this. Several prehistoric archaeological sites have been discovered within the urban area of Beirut, revealing flint tools from sequential periods dating from the Middle Palaeolithic and Upper Paleolithic through the Neolithic to the Bronze Age.

BeirutI (Minet el-Hosn) was listed as "the town of Beirut" by Louis Burkhalter and said to be on the beach near the Orient and Bassoul hotels on the Avenue des Français in central Beirut. The site was discovered by Lortet in 1894 and discussed by Godefroy Zumoffen in 1900. The flint industry from the site was described as Mousterian and is held by the Museum of Fine Arts of Lyon.

The site had been built on and destroyed by 1948.

Burkhalter suggested that it was west of the Damascus road, although this determination has been criticized by Lorraine Copeland. P. E. Gigues discovered a series of Neolithic flint tools on the surface along with the remains of a structure suggested to be a hut circle. Auguste Bergy discussed polished axes that were also found at this site, which has now completely disappeared as a result of construction and urbanization of the area.

BeirutIV (Furn esh-Shebbak, river banks) was also on the left bank of the river and on either side of the road leading eastwards from the Furn esh Shebbak police station towards the river that marked the city limits. The area was covered in red sand that represented Quaternary river terraces. The site was found by Jesuit Father Dillenseger and published by fellow Jesuits Godefroy Zumoffen, Raoul Describes and Auguste Bergy. Collections from the site were made by Bergy, Describes and another Jesuit, Paul Bovier-Lapierre. Many Middle Paleolithic flint tools were found on the surface and in side gullies that drain into the river. They included around 50 varied bifaces accredited to the Acheulean period, some with a lustrous sheen, now held at the Museum of Lebanese Prehistory. Henri Fleisch also found an Emireh point amongst material from the site, which has now disappeared beneath buildings.

BeirutV (Nahr Beirut, Beirut River) was discovered by Dillenseger and said to be in an orchard of mulberry trees on the left bank of the river, near the river mouth, and to be close to the railway station and bridge to Tripoli. Levallois flints and bones and similar surface material were found amongst brecciated deposits. The area has now been built on.

BeirutVI (Patriarchate) was a site discovered while building on the property of the Lebanese Evangelical School for Girls in the Patriarchate area of Beirut. It was notable for the discovery of a finely styled Canaanean blade javelin suggested to date to the early or middle Neolithic periods of Byblos and which is held in the school library.

BeirutVII, the Rivoli Cinema and Byblos Cinema sites near the Bourj in the Rue el Arz area, are two sites discovered by Lorraine Copeland, Peter Wescombe, and Marina Hayek in 1964 and examined by Diana Kirkbride and Roger Saidah. One site was behind the parking lot of the Byblos Cinema and showed collapsed walls, pits, floors, charcoal, pottery and flints. The other, overlooking a cliff west of the Rivoli Cinema, was composed of three layers resting on limestone bedrock. Fragments of blades and broad flakes were recovered from the first layer of black soil, above which some Bronze Age pottery was recovered in a layer of grey soil. Pieces of Roman pottery and mosaics were found in the upper layer. Middle Bronze Age tombs were found in this area, and the ancient tell of Beirut is thought to be in the Bourj area.

History

The earliest settlement of Beirut was on an island in the Beirut River, but the channel that separated it from the banks silted up and the island ceased to be. Excavations in the downtown area have unearthed layers of Phoenician, Hellenistic, Roman, Byzantine, Arab, Crusader, and Ottoman remains.

Phoenician period

The Phoenician port of Beirut was located between Rue Foch and Rue Allenby on the north coast. The port or harbour was excavated and reported on several years ago and now lies buried under the city. Controversy arose on 26 June 2012 when authorization was given by Lebanese Minister of Culture Gaby Layoun for a private company called Venus Towers Real Estate Development Company to destroy the ruins (archaeological site BEY194) in the $500 million construction project of three skyscrapers and a garden behind Hotel Monroe in downtown Beirut. Two later reports by an international committee of archaeologists appointed by Layoun, including Hanz Curver, and an expert report by Ralph Pederson, a member of the institute of Nautical Archaeology and now teaching in Marburg, Germany, dismissed the claims that the trenches were a port, on various criteria. The exact function of site BEY194 may never be known, and the issue raised heated emotions and led to increased coverage on the subject of Lebanese heritage in the press.

Hellenistic period
In 140BC, the Phoenician city was destroyed by Diodotus Tryphon during his conflict with Antiochus VII Sidetes for the throne of the Hellenistic Seleucid monarchy. Laodicea in Phoenicia was built upon the same site on a more conventional Hellenistic plan. Present-day Beirut overlies this ancient one, and little archaeology was carried out until after the civil war in 1991. The salvage excavations after 1993 have yielded new insights into the layout and history of this period of Beirut's history. Public architecture included several areas and buildings.

Mid-1st-century coins from Berytus bear the head of Tyche, goddess of fortune; on the reverse, the city's symbol appears: a dolphin entwines an anchor. This symbol was later taken up by the early printer Aldus Manutius in 15th century Venice. After a state of civil war and decline the Seleucid Empire faced, King Tigranes the Great of the Kingdom of Armenia conquered Beirut and placed it under effective Armenian control. However, after the Battle of Tigranocerta, Armenia forever lost their holdings in Syria and Beirut was conquered by Roman general Pompey.

Roman period 

Laodicea was conquered by Pompey in 64 BC and the name Berytus was restored to it. The city was assimilated into the Roman Empire, soldiers were sent there, and large building projects were undertaken. From the 1st century BC, the Bekaa Valley served as a source of grain for the Roman provinces of the Levant and even for Rome itself. Under Claudius, Berytus expanded to reach the Bekaa Valley and include Heliopolis (Baalbek). The city was settled by Roman colonists who promoted agriculture in the region.

As a result of this settlement, the city quickly became Romanized, and the city became the only mainly Latin-speaking area in the Syria-Phoenicia province. In 14BC, during the reign of Herod the Great, Berytus became a colony, one of four in the Syria-Phoenicia region and the only one with full Italian rights exempting its citizens from imperial taxation. Beirut was considered the most Roman city in the eastern provinces of the Roman Empire. Furthermore, the veterans of two Roman legions were established in the city of Berytus by emperor Augustus: the 5th Macedonian and the 3rd Gallic Legions.

Berytus's law school was widely known; two of Rome's most famous jurists, Papinian and Ulpian, were natives of Phoenicia and taught there under the Severan emperors. When Justinian assembled his Pandects in the 6th century, a large part of the corpus of laws was derived from these two jurists, and in AD533 Justinian recognised the school as one of the three official law schools of the empire.

In 551, a major earthquake struck Berytus, causing widespread damage. The earthquake reduced cities along the coast to ruins and killed many, 30,000 in Berytus alone by some measurements. As a result, the students of the law school were transferred to Sidon.

Salvage excavations since 1993 have yielded new insights in the layout and history of Roman Berytus. Public architecture included several bath complexes, Colonnaded Streets, a circus and theatre; residential areas were excavated in the Garden of Forgiveness, Martyrs' Square and the Beirut Souks.

Middle Ages
Beirut was conquered by the Muslims in 635. Prince Arslan bin al-Mundhir founded the Principality of Sin el Fil in Beirut in 759. From this principality developed the later Principality of Mount Lebanon, which was the basis for the establishment of Greater Lebanon, today's Lebanon. As a trading center of the eastern Mediterranean, Beirut was overshadowed by Acre (in modern-day Israel) during the Middle Ages. From 1110 to 1291, the town and Lordship of Beirut was part of the Kingdom of Jerusalem. The city was taken by Saladin in 1187 and recaptured in 1197 by Henry I of Brabant as part of the German Crusade of 1197. John of Ibelin, known as the Old Lord of Beirut, was granted the lordship of the city in 1204. He rebuilt the city after its destruction by the Ayyubids and also built the House of Ibelin palace in Beirut.

In 1291 Beirut was captured and the Crusaders expelled by the Mamluk army of Sultan al-Ashraf Khalil.

Ottoman rule

Under the Ottoman sultan Selim I (1512–1520), the Ottomans conquered Syria including present-day Lebanon. Beirut was controlled by local Druze emirs throughout the Ottoman period. One of them, Fakhr-al-Din II, fortified it early in the 17th century, but the Ottomans reclaimed it in 1763. With the help of Damascus, Beirut successfully broke Acre's monopoly on Syrian maritime trade and for a few years supplanted it as the main trading center in the region. During the succeeding epoch of rebellion against Ottoman hegemony in Acre under Jezzar Pasha and Abdullah Pasha, Beirut declined to a small town with a population of about 10,000 and was an object of contention between the Ottomans, the local Druze, and the Mamluks. After Ibrahim Pasha of Egypt captured Acre in 1832, Beirut began its revival.

By the second half of the nineteenth century, Beirut was developing close commercial and political ties with European imperial powers, particularly France. European interests in Lebanese silk and other export products transformed the city into a major port and commercial center. This boom in cross-regional trade allowed certain groups, such as the Sursock family, to establish trade and manufacturing empires that further strengthened Beirut's position as a key partner in the interests of imperial dynasties. Meanwhile, Ottoman power in the region continued to decline. Sectarian and religious conflicts, power vacuums, and changes in the political dynamics of the region culminated in the 1860 Lebanon conflict. Beirut became a destination for Maronite Christian refugees fleeing from the worst areas of the fighting on Mount Lebanon and in Damascus. This in turn altered the religious composition of Beirut itself, sowing the seeds of future sectarian and religious troubles there and in greater Lebanon. However, Beirut was able to prosper in the meantime. This was again a product of European intervention, and also a general realization amongst the city's residents that commerce, trade, and prosperity depended on domestic stability. After petitions by the local bourgeois, the governor of Syria Vilayet Mehmed Rashid Pasha authorized the establishment of the Beirut Municipal Council, the first municipality established in the Arab provinces of the Empire. The council was elected by an assembly of city notables and played an instrumental role governing the city through the following decades.

Vilayet of Beirut
In 1888, Beirut was made capital of a vilayet (governorate) in Syria, including the sanjaks (prefectures) Latakia, Tripoli, Beirut, Acre and Bekaa. By this time, Beirut had grown into a cosmopolitan city and had close links with Europe and the United States. It also became a centre of missionary activity that spawned educational institutions such as the American University of Beirut. Provided with water from a British company and gas from a French one, silk exports to Europe came to dominate the local economy. After French engineers established a modern harbour in 1894 and a rail link across Lebanon to Damascus and Aleppo in 1907, much of the trade was carried by French ships to Marseille. French influence in the area soon exceeded that of any other European power. The 1911 Encyclopædia Britannica reported a population consisting of 36,000 Muslims, 77,000 Christians, 2,500 Jews, 400 Druze and 4,100 foreigners. At the start of the 20th century, Salim Ali Salam was one of the most prominent figures in Beirut, holding numerous public positions including deputy from Beirut to the Ottoman parliament and President of the Municipality of Beirut. Given his modern way of life, the emergence of Salim Ali Salam as a public figure constituted a transformation in terms of the social development of the city.
In his 2003 book entitled Beirut and its Seven Families, Dr. Yussef Bin Ahmad Bin Ali Al Husseini says:

Modern era

Capital of Lebanon

After World War I and the collapse of the Ottoman Empire, Beirut, along with the rest of Lebanon, was placed under the French Mandate. Lebanon achieved independence in 1943, and Beirut became the capital city. The city remained a regional intellectual capital, becoming a major tourist destination and a banking haven, especially for the Persian Gulf oil boom.

This era of relative prosperity ended in 1975 when the Lebanese Civil War broke out throughout the country, During most of the war, Beirut was divided between the Muslim west part and the Christian east. The downtown area, previously the home of much of the city's commercial and cultural activity, became a no man's land known as the Green Line. Many inhabitants fled to other countries. About 60,000 people died in the first two years of the war (1975–1976), and much of the city was devastated. A particularly destructive period was the 1978 Syrian siege of Achrafiyeh, the main Christian district of Beirut. Syrian troops relentlessly shelled the eastern quarter of the city, but Christian militias defeated multiple attempts by Syria's elite forces to capture the strategic area in a three-month campaign later known as the Hundred Days' War.

Another destructive chapter was the 1982 Lebanon War, during which most of West Beirut was under siege by Israeli troops. In 1983, French and US barracks were bombed, killing 241 American servicemen, 58 French servicemen, six civilians and the two suicide bombers.

Between 1989 and 1990 parts on East Beirut were destroyed in fighting between army units loyal to General Aoun and Samir Geagea's Lebanese Forces.

Since the end of the war in 1990, the people of Lebanon have been rebuilding Beirut, whose urban agglomeration was mainly constituted during war time through an anarchic urban development stretching along the littoral corridor and its nearby heights. By the start of the 2006 Israel-Lebanon conflict the city had somewhat regained its status as a tourist, cultural and intellectual centre in the Middle East and as a center for commerce, fashion, and media. The reconstruction of downtown Beirut has been largely driven by Solidere, a development company established in 1994 by Prime Minister Rafic Hariri. The city has hosted both the Asian Club Basketball Championship and the Asian Football Cup, and has hosted the Miss Europe pageant nine times: 1960–1964, 1999, 2001–2002, and 2016.

Rafic Hariri was assassinated in 2005 near the Saint George Hotel in Beirut. A month later about one million people gathered for an opposition rally in Beirut. The Cedar Revolution was the largest rally in Lebanon's history at that time. The last Syrian troops withdrew from Beirut on 26 April 2005, and the two countries established diplomatic relations on 15 October 2008.

During the 2006 Lebanon War, Israeli bombardment caused damage in many parts of Beirut, especially the predominantly Shiite southern suburbs of Beirut. On 12 July 2006, the "Operation Truthful Promise" carried out by Hezbollah ended with 8 Israeli deaths and 6 injuries. In response, the IDF targeted Hezbollah's main media outlets. There were then artillery raids against targets in southern Lebanon, and the Israeli cabinet held Beirut responsible for the attacks. Then on 13 July 2006 Israel began implementing a naval and air blockade over Lebanon; during this blockade Israel bombed the runways at Beirut International Airport and the major Beirut-Damascus highway in Eastern Lebanon.

In May 2008, after the government decided to disband Hezbollah's communications network (a decision it later rescinded), violent clashes broke out briefly between government allies and opposition forces, before control of the city was handed over to the Lebanese Army. After this a national dialogue conference was held in Doha at the invitation of the Prince of Qatar. The conference agreed to appoint a new president of Lebanon and to establish a new national government involving all the political adversaries. As a result of the Doha Agreement, the opposition's barricades were dismantled and so were the opposition's protest camps in Martyrs' Square. On 19 October 2012, a car bomb killed eight people in the Beirut's neighborhood of Achrafiyeh, including Brigadier General Wissam al-Hassan, chief of the Intelligence Bureau of the Internal Security Forces. In addition, 78 others were wounded in the bombing. It was the largest attack in the capital since 2008. On 27 December 2013, a car bomb exploded in the Central District killing at least five people, including the former Lebanese ambassador to the U.S. Mohamad Chatah, and wounding 71 others.

In the 12 November 2015 Beirut bombings, two suicide bombers detonated explosives outside a mosque and inside a bakery, killing 43 people and injuring 200. The Islamic State of Iraq and the Levant immediately claimed responsibility for the attacks.

On 4 August 2020, a massive explosion in the Port of Beirut resulted in the death of at least 203 people (with an additional three missing) and the wounding of more than 6,500. Foreigners from at least 22 countries were among the casualties. Furthermore, at least 108 Bangladeshis were injured in the blasts, making them the most affected foreign community. The cause of the blast is believed to be from government-confiscated and stored ammonium nitrate. As many as 300,000 people have been left homeless by the explosion. Protesters in Lebanon called on the government on 8 August 2020 for the end of the alleged negligence that resulted in the 4 August explosion. On 10 August 2020, as a result of the protests, Prime Minister Hassan Diab announced his resignation. Weeks later, a huge fire erupted in an oil and tyre warehouse in the port's duty-free zone, on 10 September 2020.

Geography

Beirut sits on a peninsula extending westward into the Mediterranean Sea. It is flanked by the Lebanon Mountains and has taken on a triangular shape, largely influenced by its situation between and atop two hills: Al-Ashrafieh and Al-Musaytibah. The Beirut Governorate occupies , and the city's metropolitan area . The coast is rather diverse, with rocky beaches, sandy shores and cliffs situated beside one another.

Climate
Beirut has a hot-summer Mediterranean climate (Köppen: Csa) characterized by mild days and nights, as its coastal location allows temperatures to be moderated by the sea. Autumn and spring are warm, but short. Winter is mild and rainy. Summer is prolonged, hot and muggy. The prevailing wind during the afternoon and evening is from the west (onshore, blowing in from the Mediterranean); at night it reverses to offshore, blowing from the land out to sea.

Much of the autumn and spring rain falls in heavy downpours on a limited number of days, but in winter it is spread more evenly over many days. Summer receives very little rainfall, if any. Snow is rare, except in the mountainous eastern suburbs, where snowfall occurs due to the region's high altitudes. Hail (which can often be heavy) occurs a few times per year, mostly during winter.

Environmental issues

Lebanon, especially Beirut and its suburbs, suffered a massive garbage crisis, mainly from July 2015 up to March 2016. The issue began when authorities shut down the main landfill site originally used for Beirut's garbage south-east of the city and failed to provide any alternative solutions for months. As a result, garbage mounted in the streets in Greater Beirut and caused protests to erupt, which sometimes invoked police action. This problem was commonly blamed on the country's political situation. This garbage crisis birthed a movement called "You Stink" which was directed at the country's politicians. In March 2016, the government finally came up with a so-called temporary solution to establish two new landfills East and South of the city to store the garbage, while several municipalities across the country, in an unprecedented move, began recycling and managing waste more efficiently, building waste-management facilities and relying on themselves rather than the central government. Moreover, Beirut has a lack of green areas with just two main public gardens (sanayeh and horch Beirut). In fact, concrete roofs cover 80% of the capital area.

Quarters and sectors

Beirut is divided into 12 quarters:
 Achrafieh
 Dar Mreisse 
 Bachoura
 Mazraa (with the neighbourhood Badaro)
 Medawar (with the neighbourhood Mar Mikhaël)
 Minet El Hosn
 Moussaitbeh (with Ramlet al-Baida)
 Port
 Ras Beirut
 Remeil
 Saifi
 Zuqaq al-Blat

These quarters are divided into 59 sectors.

Badaro is an edgy, bohemian style neighborhood, within the green district of Beirut which also include the Beirut Hippodrome and the Beirut Pine Forest and the French ambassador's Pine Residence. It is one of Beirut's favorite hip nightlife destination.

Two of the twelve official Palestinian refugee camps in Lebanon are located in the southern suburbs of Beirut: Bourj el-Barajneh and Shatila. There is also one within its municipal boundaries: Mar Elias.

Southern suburban districts include Chiyah, Ghobeiry (Bir Hassan, Jnah and Ouzai are part of the Ghobeiry municipality), Haret Hreik, Burj al Barajneh, Laylake-Mreijeh, Hay al Sillum and Hadath. Eastern suburbs include Burj Hammoud, Sin el Fil, Dekwane and Mkalles. Hazmiyeh is also considered as an eastern suburb with its close proximity to the capital. Of the 15 unregistered or unofficial refugee camps, Sabra, which lies adjacent to Shatila, is also located in southern Beirut and was the scene of a massacre during the civil war.

People in Lebanon often use different names for the same geographic locations, and few people rely on official, government-provided street numbers. Instead, historic and commercial landmarks are more commonly used.

Demographics
No population census has been taken in Lebanon since 1932, but estimates of Beirut's population range from as low as 938,940 through 1,303,129 to as high as 2,200,000 as part of Greater Beirut.

Religion

Beirut is one of the most cosmopolitan and religiously diverse cities of Lebanon and all of the Middle East. Before the civil war the neighborhoods of Beirut were fairly heterogeneous, but they became largely segregated by religion since the conflict. East Beirut has a mainly Christian population with a small Muslim minority, whilst West Beirut has a Sunni Muslim majority with small minorities of Shia, Christians and Druze. Since the end of the civil war, East and West Beirut have begun to see an increase in Muslims and Christians moving into each half. Christians comprise 35% of Beirut's population, Muslims 63%, Druze 1%, and others 1%.

Family matters such as marriage, divorce and inheritance are still handled by the religious authorities representing a person's faith (the Ottoman "millet" system). Calls for civil marriage are unanimously rejected by the religious authorities, but civil marriages held in another country are recognized by Lebanese civil authorities.

Beirut Central District

The Beirut Central District (BCD) or Centre Ville is the name given to Beirut's historical and geographical core by "Solidere", the "vibrant financial, commercial, and administrative hub of the country". It is an area thousands of years old, traditionally a focus of business, finance, culture and leisure. Its reconstruction constitutes one of the most ambitious contemporary urban developments. Due to the devastation incurred on the city center from the Lebanese Civil War, the Beirut Central District underwent a thorough reconstruction and development plan that gave it back its cultural and economic position in the region. Ever since, Beirut Central District has evolved into an integrated business and commercial environment and the focus of the financial activity in the region. That evolution was accompanied with the relocation of international organizations, reoccupation of civic and government buildings, expansion of financial activities, and establishment of regional headquarters and global firms in the city center.

Assessment of the demand for build-up space in the BCD has been done in reference to a number of macro-economic, demographic, and urban planning considerations at a time of marked need for new activity poles in the city, such as Souks, financial, cultural and recreational centers. The Beirut Central District contains over 60 gardens, squares and open spaces.

The central district is Lebanon's prime location for shopping, entertainment, and dining. There are over 100 cafes, restaurants, pubs and nightclubs open in the Beirut Central District, and over 350 retail outlets distributed along its streets and quarters. Beirut Souks alone are home to over 200 stores and a handful of restaurants and cafes. Beirut Souks are the Central District's old medieval market, recently renovated along with the original Hellenistic street grid that characterized the old souks and the area's historical landmarks along long vaulted shopping alleys and arcades. Solidere, the company responsible for the reconstruction and renovation of the district, organizes music and entertainment events all throughout the year like the Beirut Marathon, Fête de la Musique, Beirut Jazz Festival.

However, the means of urban development in this particular area of the city was subject to much criticism and controversy. Rafic Hariri, who would later become prime minister, was the majority stakeholder of the company, which raises concerns of conflict of interest in the context of a public-private partnership. Many of the expropriations that have made the project possible have been made at undervalued land rates, and partly paid in company share. Strict urbanization laws were put in order to oblige people to sell and not renovate themselves. Today, Solidere acts as a de facto municipality, thus this quarter of the city is effectively privatized. It is for example forbidden to ride bikes on Zeituna Bay, a marina where many restaurants are located, and these laws are enforced by private security guards not national or municipal police.

The project was also criticized for destroying some of the city's architectural and cultural heritage. "Among the hundreds of destroyed buildings were "the last Ottoman and medieval remains in Beirut" wrote American University of Beirut professor Nabil Beyhum in the Journal The Beirut Review in 1992. Much of the damage had been done through unapproved demolitions in the 1980s and early 1990s, bringing down "some of the capital's most significant buildings and structures," wrote UCLA professor Saree Makdisi in the journal, Critical Inquiry, in 1997.". Moreover, many of the traditional privately owned shops in the Beirut Downtown were replaced by luxury outlets and high-end restaurants that only few people could afford. And most of public spaces promised by Solidere since the start of the reconstruction, such as "The Garden of Forgiveness", a central park, and an archaeological museum, remain unfinished until today, putting into question the actual benefit of the project to the population.

Finally, the actual success of the project has recently been in doubt, given that large quarters of the BCD are today empty, due to strong military presence, the Nejmeh Square where the parliament is located is most frequently completely deserted, and the businesses located there have mostly moved.

Economy

Beirut's economy is service-oriented with the main growth sectors being banking and tourism.

In an area dominated by authoritarian or militarist regimes, the Lebanese capital was generally regarded as a haven of libertarianism, though a precarious one. With its seaport and airport—coupled with Lebanon's free economic and foreign exchange system, solid gold-backed currency, banking-secrecy law, and favorable interest rates—Beirut became an established banking center for Arab wealth, much of which was invested in construction, commercial enterprise, and industry (mostly the manufacture of textiles and shoes, food processing, and printing). The economy of Beirut is diverse, including publishing, banking, trade and various industries. During that period, Beirut was the region's financial services center. At the onset of the oil boom starting in the 1960s, Lebanon-based banks were the main recipients of the region's petrodollars.

Beirut is the focal point of the Economy of Lebanon. The capital hosts the headquarters of Banque du Liban  (Lebanon's central bank), the Beirut Stock Exchange, the head office of Lebanon's flag-carrier Middle East Airlines, the United Nations Economic and Social Commission for Western Asia, the Union of Arab Banks, and the Union of Arab Stock Exchanges.

Banking and finance

The Banking System is the backbone of the local economy with a balance sheet of $152 billion at the end of 2012, nearing 3.5 times the GDP estimated at $43 billion by the IMF. Bank deposits also increased in 2012 by 8% to 125 billion dollars, 82 percent of the sector's assets. "Banks are still attracting deposits because the interest rates offered are higher than the ones in Europe and the United States", says Marwan Mikhael, head of research at BLOM Bank.

Beirut's foreign reserves were still close to an all-time high when they reached $32.5 billion in 2011 and analysts say that the Central Bank can cover nearly 80 percent of the Lebanese currency in the market. This means that the Central Bank can easily cope with any unforeseen crisis in the future thanks to the massive foreign currency reserves.

The Lebanese banking system is endowed with several characteristics that promote the role of Beirut as a regional financial center, in terms of ensuring protection for foreign capital and earnings. The Lebanese currency is fully convertible and can be exchanged freely with any other currency. Moreover, no restrictions are put on the free flow of capital and earnings into and out of the Lebanese economy. The passing of the banking secrecy law on 3 September 1956, subjected all banks established in Lebanon as well as foreign banks' branches to the "secret of the profession". Both article 16 of law No. 282 dated 30 December 1993 and article 12 of decree No. 5451 dated 26 August 1994, offer exemptions from income tax on all interest and revenues earned on all types of accounts opened in Lebanese banks. On the first of April 1975, decree No. 29 established a free banking zone by granting the Lebanese government the right to exempt non-residents' deposits and liabilities in foreign currency from: the income tax on interest earned, the required reserves imposed by the Banque Du Liban by virtue of article 76 of the Code of Money and Credit, the premium of deposit guarantee imposed on bank deposits to the profit of the National Deposit Guarantee Institution.

Tourism

The tourism industry in Beirut has been historically important to the local economy and remains to this day to be a major source of revenue for the city, and Lebanon in general. Before the Lebanese Civil War, Beirut was widely regarded as the "Paris of the Middle East", often cited as a financial and business hub where visitors could experience the Levantine Mediterranean culture. Beirut's diverse atmosphere and ancient history make it an important destination which is slowly rebuilding itself after continued turmoil. However, in recent times, certain countries, such as the United States, have frequently placed Lebanon, and Beirut in particular, on their travel warnings lists due to the many car bombings and orchestrated acts of political violence.

According to the 2012 tourist statistics, 34% of the tourists in Beirut came from states within the Arab League, 33% came from European countries (mainly France, Germany, and Britain), and 16% from the Americas (about half of which are from the United States).

The largely pedestrianized Beirut Central District is the core of the Beirut tourism scene. The district is a cluster of stone-façade buildings lining arcaded streets and radial alleyways. The architecture of the area is a mix of French Architecture and Venetian Gothic architecture mixed with Arabesque and Ottoman Architecture. The district contains numerous old mosques and crusader churches, as well as uncovered remnants and ruins of the Roman era. The District contains dozens of restaurants, cafes and pubs, as well as a wide range of shopping stores mainly in Beirut Souks. High-rise hotels and towers line the district's New Waterfront, marina and seaside promenade.

Another popular tourist destination in Beirut is the Corniche Beirut, a  pedestrian promenade that encircles the capital's seafront from the Saint George Bay in the north all the way to Avenue de Paris and Avenue General de Gaulle south of the city. The corniche reaches its maximum height above sea level at Raouché, a high-rise residential neighbourhood rising over a giant white limestone cliff and facing the recognisable off-shore Raouché Rocks.

Badaro is one of Beirut's most appealing neighborhoods, a lovely place to stroll during daytime and a destination for going out in the evening. Badaro is within Beirut's green district with a  public park (The Beirut Pine forest) and a  hippodrome. It is a neighborhood on a very human scale with small groceries around every corner. The neighborhood residents, a mix of old impoverished Christian bourgeoisie, bohemian style people in their 30s and well-established urban professionals, are loyal to local bakery and pastry shops. Because of the blossoming café and bar scene it has become lately a hip destination for Beirut's young and restless but old Beirutis remember that Badaro was already Beirut's version of the Village in the swinging sixties. Groceries and eateries can be found on almost every street of the area. There are dozens of restaurants, pubs and footpath cafés of virtually every style. Badaro "Village" thrives on local residents, day-trippers and hipsters from all over Beirut, office employees and many expatriates.

Hamra Street is a long cobblestone street connecting the Beirut Central District with the coastal Raouche area. The street is a large concentration of shopping stores, boutiques, restaurants, banks, street vendors, footpath cafes, newspaper kiosks, and a booming nightlife spurred by students from the neighboring American University of Beirut. The AUB campus is another popular visitor destination, composed of a cluster of 19th century red-roofed buildings dispersed on a wooded hillside overlooking the Mediterranean.

Gemmayzeh is Beirut's artistic bohemian quarter, full of narrow streets and historic buildings from the French era. It is located East of the Beirut Central District, bordering the Saifi Village. The neighborhood is well known for its trendy bars and pubs, cafes, restaurants and lounges; most are directly located on Rue Gouraud, the main thoroughfare that cuts through the middle of the district. Travel + Leisure magazine called Gemmayzeh "SoHo by the Sea," due to its colorful and chic cafés amid 1950s apartment buildings and hole-in-the-wall shops. However, Gemmayzeh received the most damage by the Beirut explosion in 2020.
 
Beirut is a destination for tourists from both the Arab world and West. In Travel + Leisure magazine's World Best Awards 2006, it was ranked the 9th best city in the world. That list was voted upon shortly before the 2006 Lebanon War broke out, but in 2008 The Guardian listed Beirut as one of its top ten cities in the world. The New York Times ranked it at number one on its "44 places to go" list of 2009. 2011 MasterCard Index revealed that Beirut had the second-highest visitor spending levels in the Middle East and Africa, totaling $6.5 billion. Beirut was chosen in 2012 by Condé Nast Traveller as the best city in the Middle East, beating Tel Aviv and Dubai.

Many of the tourists are returning Lebanese expatriates, but many are from Western countries. Approximately 3 million visitors visited in 2010; the previous record was 1.4 million in 1974.

Like other forms of tourism, medical tourism in Lebanon is on the rise recently. Although visitors from neighboring Arab nations make up the bulk of medical tourism patients here due to its proximity, Beirut is strongly trying to woo more Southern Europeans, Asians and North Americans to its land. Its Agency for Investment Development in Lebanon reports that growth in the medical tourism industry is growing by up to 30% a year since 2009. The country's tourism ministry is working closely with the medical sector and top-class hotels to create an organized, quality medical destination. Major hotel and spa chains work with local clinics, travel agencies and the tourism ministry to create comprehensive healthcare and recuperation packages for foreign visitors. The government is highly involved in this industry and strives to make the process as easy as possible.
Cosmetic surgery is a major component of medical tourism in Lebanon. Most of the foreign patients come for routine operations like plastic surgery, dental or eye surgery, and Beirut's hospitals are also capable of performing specialized procedures such as internal bypass surgery and other technical treatments. Its top clinics and hospitals like Sahel General are equipped to handle the full range of surgical procedures. Beirut-based Clemenceau Medical Center (CMC), affiliated with Johns Hopkins International, was ranked one of the world's top ten best hospitals for medical tourism in 2012.

Government
Beirut is the capital of Lebanon and its seat of government. The Lebanese Parliament, all the Ministries and most of the public administrations, embassies and consulates are there. Beirut Governorate is one of eight mohafazat (plural of mohafazah, or governorate).

International Organizations
The city is home to numerous international organizations. The United Nations Economic and Social Commission for Western Asia (ESCWA) is headquartered in downtown Beirut, The Arab Air Carriers Organization (AACO), the Union of Arab Banks and the Union of Arab Stock Exchanges and  the World youth alliance are also headquartered in the city. The International Labour Organization (ILO) and UNESCO (United Nations Educational, Scientific and Cultural Organization) both have regional offices in Beirut covering the Arab world.

Education
Higher education throughout Lebanon is provided by universities, colleges and technical and vocational institutes. The Directorate General of Higher Education is responsible for managing universities, colleges, and institutes in Beirut and nationwide.

The American University of Beirut (AUB) and Université Saint-Joseph (USJ) are the oldest English-language and French-language universities in the country, respectively. AUB was founded in 1866, and USJ in 1875. The Lebanese University is the only public institution for higher education in Beirut. Beirut is also home to Lebanese American University (LAU), American University of Science and Technology (AUST), University of Balamand, École Supérieure des Affaires (ESA), Beirut Arab University (BAU), Haigazian University (HU), Lebanese International University (LIU), Notre Dame University – Louaize (NDU), and Université La Sagesse (ULS).

Among the private secondary schools in Beirut are Lycee Abdel Kader, Grand Lycée Franco-Libanais, Lycée Franco-Libanais Verdun, American Community School, International College, Collège Louise Wegmann, Rawdah High School, Saint Mary's Orthodox College, Collège Notre Dame de Nazareth, Collège du Sacré-Coeur Gemmayzé, Collège Protestant Français, Armenian Evangelical Central High School, German School of Beirut, and the Armenian Hamazkayin Arslanian College.

Transportation

The city's renovated airport is the Rafic Hariri International Airport, located in the southern suburbs. The Port of Beirut, one of the largest and most commercial in the eastern Mediterranean, is another port of entry. As a final destination, Lebanon can be reached by road from Damascus via the Beqaa valley in the east.

Beirut has frequent bus connections to other cities in Lebanon and major cities in Syria such as Homs and its capital Damascus. There are a number of different companies providing public transport in Lebanon. The publicly owned buses are managed by Office des Chemins de Fer et des Transports en Commun (OCFTC – "Railway and Public Transportation Authority"). Buses for northern destinations and Syria leave from Charles Helou Station.

The ministry of transport and public works purchased an extra 250 intra and inter-buses in 2012 to better serve regions outside the capital as well as congestion-choked Beirut, hoping to lessen the use of private cars.

Beirut has also private buses that are provided by the Lebanese Commuting Company.

In 2017, Beirut introduced a bike sharing service in certain areas of the city.

Culture

The culture of Beirut has evolved under the influence of many different peoples and civilizations, such as Greeks, Romans, Arabs, Ottoman Turks and French. The law school in downtown Beirut was one of the world's earliest and was considered to be a leading center of legal studies in the Eastern Roman Empire.

Beirut hosted the Francophonie and Arab League summits in 2002, and in 2007 it hosted the ceremony for the Prix Albert Londres, which rewards outstanding francophone journalists every year. The city also hosted the Jeux de la Francophonie in 2009. In the same year, it was proclaimed World Book Capital by UNESCO.

Beirut has also been called the "party capital of the Arab world". Rue Monnot has an international reputation among clubbers, and Rue Gouraud in districts such as Gemmayze and Mar Mikhael have emerged as new hotspots for bar patrons and clubbers, as well as "The Alleyway" in Hamra Street.

Museums

The National Museum of Beirut is the principal museum of archaeology in Lebanon. It has about 1,300 exhibits ranging in date from prehistoric times to the medieval Mamluk period. The Archaeological Museum of the American University of Beirut is the third-oldest museum in the Middle East, exhibiting a wide range of artefacts from Lebanon and neighboring countries. Sursock Museum was built by the illustrious Sursock family at the end of the 19th century as a private villa for Nicolas Sursock, and then donated to the Lebanese state upon his death. It now houses Beirut's most influential and popular art museum. The permanent collection shows a set of Japanese engravings, numerous works of Islamic art and classic Italian paintings, while temporary exhibitions are also shown throughout the year. The Robert Mouawad Private Museum near Beirut's Grand Serail exhibits Henri Pharaon's private collection of archaeology and antiques.

Planet Discovery is a children's science museum with interactive experiments, exhibitions, performances, workshops and awareness competitions. The Saint Joseph University opened the Museum of Lebanese Prehistory in 2000, the first prehistory museum in the Arabic Middle East, displaying bones, stone tools and neolithic pottery collected by Jesuits.

In October 2013, Mim Museum, a private mineral museum, opened its doors to the public. It has on display some 2000 minerals from more than 70 countries. Mim museum's collection is considered to be one of the world's paramount private collection for the variety and quality of its minerals. A didactic circuit, accompanied by screens showing films and scientific applications of mineralogy, will reveal a world of unsuspected marvels—priceless both from an aesthetic and scientific point of view. Mimodactylus libanensis "mimo", the fossil of a pterodactyl, is featured in a special wing. This one-of-a-kind complete specimen in the Middle-East was found in Lebanon. It is promoted by means of state-of-the-art modern techniques: a hologram, an auto-stereoscopic movie, a full-scale reconstitution and a game "fly with mimo" – an entertainment that delights children and adults. Moreover, Mim hosts a thematic exhibition of 200 marine fossils. "Fish'n'Stone" was organised with the collaboration of Mémoire du Temps. Known throughout the world, those fossils were quarried in the Lebanese mountains. The history of the fossil formation is shown through an animation that submerses you in the marine life – a time capsule that takes you in a journey to some 100 million of years ago.

Tourism
Beirut was named the top place to visit by The New York Times in 2009, and as one of the ten liveliest cities in the world by Lonely Planet in the same year. According to a 2010 study by the American global consulting firm Mercer comparing high-end items such as upscale residential areas and entertainment venues, Beirut was ranked as the 4th most expensive city in the Middle East and 15th among the Upper Middle Income Countries included in the survey. Beirut came in first place regionally and 10th place internationally in a 2010 study by "EuroCost International" about the rental markets for high quality housing. Beirut is an international hub of highly active and diverse nightlife with bars, dance bars and nightclubs staying open well past midnight.
The 2011 MasterCard Index revealed that Beirut had the second-highest visitor spending levels in the Middle East and Africa, totaling $6.5 billion. Beirut was chosen in 2012 by Condé Nast Traveller as the best city in the Middle East. In 2013, Condé Nast Traveller ranked Beirut in the top 20 best cities in the world.

On 7 December 2014, Beirut was selected to be among the New 7 Wonders of Cities, along with Doha, Durban, La Paz, Havana, Kuala Lumpur and Vigan. The campaign was held by New 7 Wonders.

In 2016, Yahoo listed Beirut as the best international city for food. Travel and Leisure ranked Beirut in the top 15 of the world's best cities.

It was voted the must-visit city for the year 2019 by World Tourists.

Due to anti-government protests as of October 2019 followed by dire economic situation and travel bans due to coronavirus outbreak, the tourism sector was badly affected resulting in decrease of number of tourists.

Media
Beirut is a main centre for the television, radio stations, newspaper, and book publishing industries.

Television stations based in Beirut include Télé Liban, LBC, ÓTV (Orange TV), MTV Lebanon, Tele Lumiere (Catholic TV), Future TV, New TV, NBN, ANB and Saudi TV 1 on 33 UHF and MBC 1, MBC 4, MBC Action, Fox, Al Jazeera, Rotana, OSN First, OSN News, Al Yawm and Arabic Series Channel on 45 UHF.

Radio Stations include Mix FM Lebanon, Virgin Radio Lebanon, Radio One Lebanon, Sawt el Ghad, RLL, Jaras Scoop, NRJ Lebanon...

Newspapers include Daily Beirut An-Nahar, Al Joumhouria, As-Safir, Al Mustaqbal, Al-Akhbar, Al-Balad, Ad-Diyar, Al Anwar, Al Sharq.

Newspapers and magazines published in French include L'Orient Le Jour (since 1970), La Revue Du Liban, Al Balad-French Version, Al Intiqad, Magazine L'Hebdo and La Commerce Du Levant.

English newspapers published in Beirut are The Daily Star, Executive Magazine (weekly), Beirut Online, Beirut Times (weekly) and Monday Morning.

Sports
The Lebanese capital hosted the Mediterranean Games in 1959, FIBA Asia Champions Cup in 1999, 2000, 2012, the AFC Asian Cup in 2000, and the FIBA Asia Cup in 2010. Beirut was the host city for the 6th Annual Games of the Jeux de la Francophonie in 2009. Beirut also hosted the Pan Arab Games in 1957, 1997, and did so again in 2015. In 2017, Beirut also hosted the 2017 FIBA Asia Cup.

Beirut, with Sidon and Tripoli, hosted the 2000 AFC Asian Cup. There are two stadiums in the city, Camille Chamoun Sports City Stadium and Beirut Municipal Stadium.

Basketball is the most popular sport in Lebanon. Currently, 4 Beirut teams play in Lebanese Basketball League: Hekmeh, Sporting Al Riyadi Beirut, Homenetmen Beirut and Beirut.

Other sports events in Beirut include the annual Beirut Marathon, hip ball, weekly horse racing at the Beirut Hippodrome, and golf and tennis tournaments that take place at Golf Club of Lebanon. Three out of the five teams in the Lebanese rugby league championship are based in Beirut. Lebanon men's national ice hockey team plays out of Montreal, in Canada.

Art and fashion

There are hundreds of art galleries in Beirut and its suburbs. Every year, hundreds of fine art students graduate from universities and institutions. Artist workshops exist all over Lebanon. The inauguration of the Beirut Art Center, a non-profit association, space and platform dedicated to contemporary art in Lebanon, in the Mkalles suburb of Beirut added to the number of exhibition spaces available in the city, with a screening and performance room, mediatheque, book store, café and terrace. Adjacent to the latter is the Ashkal Alwan Home Workspace, a venue hosting cultural events and educational programs.

A number of international fashion designers have displayed their work in big fashion shows. Most major fashion labels have shops in Beirut's shopping districts, and the city is home to a number of local fashion designers, some of whom like Elie Saab, Yara Farhat, Reem Acra, Zuhair Murad, Georges Chakra, Georges Hobeika, Jean Faris, Nicolas Jebran, Rabih Kayrouz and Abed Mahfouz have achieved international fame.

Beirut is also the home for a dynamic street art scene that has developed after the Lebanese Civil War, one of the most notable street artists is Yazan Halwani who is known to produce the largest murals on the walls of Beirut in areas such as Gemmayzeh, Hamra, Verdun and Achrafieh.

Beirut is also international artists' concert tour stop city. Artists like Shakira, Mariah Carey, Enrique Iglesias, Andrea Bocelli, Pitbull, Engelbert Humperdinck, Scorpions, and many more have included Beirut on their concert tours.

In art, literature, and popular culture

 Tawfiq Yusuf 'Awwad's 1972 novel Death In Beirut (Arabic: طواحين بيروت) takes place in Beirut in the late 1960s.
 Ghada al-Samman's 1977 book Beirut Nightmares (Arabic: كوابيس بيروت) describes Beirut during the civil war in the mid-1970s.
 Caramel, a 2007 film by Nadine Labaki, tells the story of five women who work in a beauty salon in Beirut.
 The 2008 Israeli animated film Waltz with Bashir portrays Beirut during the Israeli invasion in 1982.
 William Henry Bartlett painted a view of the city with Mount Lebanon in the background in 1838, with a poetical illustration by Letitia Elizabeth Landon, as 
 American rock band Beirut is named for the city.
 In the American television series Homeland, the episode "Beirut Is Back" (2012) was widely mocked for its portrayal of Beirut's Hamra neighborhood, which the show depicted as being a Hezbollah stronghold. Lebanon's government considered filing a lawsuit in response to the episode.

Gallery

Twin towns and sister cities
Beirut is twinned with:

 Athens, Greece
 Los Angeles, United States
 Paris, France
 Yerevan, Armenia
 Lusaka, Zambia

See also
 Beirut International Exhibition & Leisure Center
 2020 Beirut explosion

Notes

References

Citations

Bibliography
 .
 .
 .
 .
 .
 .

External links

 
 
Map of Beirut, 1936., Eran Laor Cartographich Collection, The National Library of Israel, Historic Cities Research Project.

 
Capitals in Asia

Populated places in Beirut Governorate
Mediterranean port cities and towns in Lebanon
Populated coastal places in Lebanon
Phoenician cities